Village Creek State Park is a state park in the Piney Woods of eastern Texas in the Hardin County city of Lumberton. The heavily forested,  park opened in 1994. It is named for Village Creek, a clean, sand-bottomed, free-flowing tributary of the Neches River.

The forested area features cypress swamps including bald cypress, water tupelo, river birch, riverflat hawthorn, and yaupon holly trees.

Wildlife includes snapping turtle, white-tailed deer, diamondback water snake, and possum.

Fishing includes channel catfish, bass, crappie, and bluegill.

Overnight features
 25 water & electric campsites
 15 walk-in tent campsites
 Restroom with showers
 RV dump station
 Group primitive camping area

Day-use features
 Picnic area
 Group picnic pavilion
 Children's playground
 Hiking trails totaling 8 miles. Bicycles are allowed on most trails.

References
Pamphlets and maps issued by Texas Parks and Wildlife.

External links
 Park guide
 Village Creek State Park
PM Magazine video segment on Village Creek State Park from the Texas Archive of the Moving Image

Protected areas of Hardin County, Texas
State parks of Texas